Santa Maria del Carmine  is a church in Milan, Italy. It was built in 1446.

History
In 1268, the Carmelites obtained a site near the Castello Sforzesco where, starting from the 14th century, they built a convent with an annexed church. The latter was, however, destroyed in a fire in 1330. The rebuilt church fell into disuse before the end of the century, after the friars moved to another convent.

The new church was built from 1400, under the design of friar Bernardo da Venezia. Works were completed in 1446. The vault crumbled down three years after completion and a restoration was necessary. In the mid-15th century, the church became a favourite destination for aristocratic burials, as testified by the numerous noble tombs in the chapels and niches. In the 17th century, the presbytery was remade in the Baroque style. The current façade was designed by  Carlo Maciachini and completed in  1880.

Description
The interior has a nave and two aisles. They are covered by crossed vault ceilings and separated by large circular pillars in brick or simple stone. In the naves and transepts are several artworks, including works by Camillo Procaccini depicting St Charles Borromeo Praying (1585) and other works by the painter in the Chapel of Madonna del Carmine, as well as a Madonna statue at the altar.

The high altar has a small temple inspired by that in the Milan Cathedral.

External links
Official website

Roman Catholic churches completed in 1446
15th-century Roman Catholic church buildings in Italy
Roman Catholic churches completed in 1880
Maria Carmine
Gothic architecture in Milan